Mass No. 4 in C major,  452, is a mass composed by Franz Schubert in 1816. It was originally scored for soprano, alto, tenor and bass soloists, SATB choir, violin I and II, and basso continuo (cello, double bass and organ). It is classified as a missa solemnis.

Background

The setting was composed in June–July 1816, and possibly received its first performance in late summer or early fall of the same year at the Lichtental Church. As in his previous masses, the soprano solos were written with Therese Grob's voice in mind.

Schubert's contemporary diary entries confirm his interest in Mozart's missae breves, along with the music of Michael Haydn, another Salzburg composer.

Schubert made considerable revisions to the mass for subsequent performances. He added parts for 2 oboes or clarinets, 2 trumpets and timpani, all , for an 1825 performance in St. Ulrich, Vienna. It is likely that this was in anticipation of a performance where a soloist of Grob's calibre was unavailable.

Schubert sold the score of Mass No. 4 and some shorter church works to Anton Diabelli for publishing in 1825. It was the only mass published during the composer's lifetime. Schubert dedicated the publication to Michael Holzer, the organist and choirmaster at the Lichtental church, and his teacher in organ, singing, figured bass and counterpoint.

Structure
The mass consists of six movements. Performances require approximately 23 minutes. Commentary is for  452, unless otherwise indicated.

 While Schubert habitually omitted certain passages of the Creed, in this mass he makes the unusual exclusion of the words "" (of the Virgin Mary).
 , ( 961) , A minor, cut common time; choir

Notes

References

External links
 (includes soprano and choir settings of Benedictus; 1825 orchestration with wind, brass and timpani)
 (choir setting of Benedictus only)

Masses by Franz Schubert
1816 compositions
Compositions in C major